Alexis Lepage (born 26 April 1994) is a Canadian triathlete. He competed in the 2020 Summer Olympics.

References

1994 births
Living people
Sportspeople from Montreal
Triathletes at the 2020 Summer Olympics
Canadian male triathletes
Olympic triathletes of Canada
Pan American Games medalists in triathlon
Pan American Games silver medalists for Canada
Triathletes at the 2019 Pan American Games
Medalists at the 2019 Pan American Games
21st-century Canadian people